Hu Di (1905 – September 1935) was a Chinese filmmaker and Communist secret agent during the Republic of China era. After the Kuomintang (KMT) began its suppression of the Communists in 1927, Hu worked as a mole in the Kuomintang secret service, together with Qian Zhuangfei and Li Kenong. Chinese Premier Zhou Enlai called them "the three most distinguished intelligence workers of the Party." Hu was executed in September 1935 by the renegade Communist commander Zhang Guotao during the Long March.

Life and career
Hu was born Hu Baichang in 1905 in Shucheng County, Anhui Province. He also used the names Hu Beifeng and Hu Ma.

In 1923, he was admitted to China University in Beijing, where he befriended Qian Zhuangfei and his wife Zhang Wenhua. In 1925, the three secretly joined the Communist Party of China, and they worked closely together. They established the Guanghua Film Company, using filmmaking as a cover for their underground activities. After the KMT's April 1927 massacre of the Communists in Shanghai, and the execution of Communist leader Li Dazhao by Fengtian clique leader Zhang Zuolin in Beijing, the three moved to Shanghai, where Hu found work at the Shanghai Film Company. He met the experienced Communist underground worker Li Kenong and introduced him to Qian.

In 1929, Qian successfully infiltrated the KMT's secret service and was appointed the chief coordinator of the central intelligence headquarters in Nanjing, in charge of recruiting more special agents. This created opportunities for Hu Di and Li Kenong to join the KMT secret service as moles. Hu was made the chief of the KMT's Tianjin secret service unit, disguised as the Great Wall News Agency, while Li ran the Shanghai unit, ostensibly the Broadcast News Service. Their intelligence reports helped the Red Army in the Jiangxi Soviet thwart the first two of Chiang Kai-shek's Encirclement Campaigns.

On 24 April 1931, Gu Shunzhang, Zhou Enlai's security chief and head of the Communist Party's dreaded Red Brigade, was arrested in Wuhan while on a mission to assassinate Chiang Kai-shek. To save himself, Gu defected to the KMT, and disclosed his extensive knowledge about Communist organizations. Qian Zhuangfei intercepted a telegram sent by the Wuhan police to the Nanjing headquarters, and delivered the message to Li Kenong in Shanghai, who in turned informed Zhou Enlai and telegraphed Hu Di, who immediately boarded a foreign ship and left Tianjin for Shanghai. In August 1931, Hu Di and Qian Zhuangfei left Shanghai for the Jiangxi Soviet, the Communist base area in Jiangxi Province.

Death and legacy
In 1934, the Communists were forced to evacuate the Jiangxi base area and begin the Long March. In June 1935, the Red Army arrived in Sichuan Province, where the commanders Zhu De and Zhang Guotao disagreed on the direction to continue. Zhu wanted to go north to Yan'an but Zhang ordered his soldiers to head south. Hu Di opposed Zhang's move. In revenge, Zhang labelled Hu a KMT spy and had him executed in September.

Zhou Enlai later called Qian Zhuangfei, Li Kenong, and Hu Di "the three most distinguished intelligence workers of the Party," and said that he and other Communist leaders owed their lives to them. Li, the sole survivor of the three who lived to see the founding of the People's Republic of China, was awarded the military rank of general (shang jiang) in 1955, despite having no combat experience.

References

Bibliography

1905 births
1935 deaths
Chinese communists
People from Lu'an
Chinese spies
People of the Chinese Civil War